Saara Chaudry (born June 7, 2004) is a Canadian actress. She is most noted for her performances in The Breadwinner, for which she won an ACTRA Award for Best Voice Performance and was a finalist for Voice Acting in a Feature Production at the 45th Annie Awards, and The Curse of Clara: A Holiday Tale, for which she was a shortlisted Canadian Screen Award nominee for Best Performance in an Animated Television Program or Series at the 5th Canadian Screen Awards. She has also appeared in the television series Combat Hospital, Degrassi, Odd Squad, Max & Shred and Dino Dana.

Filmography

Film

Television

Awards and nominations

Personal life 
She is of Indian descent.
She was accepted into Harvard University.

References

External links

2004 births
Living people
Actresses from Toronto
Canadian actresses of Indian descent
Canadian actresses of Pakistani descent
Canadian child actresses
Canadian film actresses
Canadian television actresses
Canadian voice actresses
21st-century Canadian actresses